The Demobilised Soldiers' Union was a political party in Estonia between 1921 and 1925.

History
The party was established in 1923. In the elections that year it won a single seat in the Riigikogu (taken by Heinrich Laretei) with 1.2% of the vote.

The party was dissolved in 1925 after the Estonian Defence League was re-established.

References

Defunct political parties in Estonia
Political parties established in 1923
Political parties disestablished in 1925